Hippodamia (also Hippodamea and Hippodameia; Ancient Greek: Ἱπποδάμεια  "she who masters horses" derived from  hippos "horse" and  damazein "to tame") was a Greek mythological figure. She was the queen of Pisa as the wife of Pelops.

Family 
Hippodamia was the daughter of King Oenomaus of Pisa either by Sterope, daughter of Atlas and Pleione, Evarete, daughter of Acrisius and Eurydice, or Eurythoe, daughter of Danaus. She was probably the sister of Leucippus and Alcippe, wife of Evenus and mother of Marpessa.

Hippodamia married Pelops, son of King Tantalus of Lydia, and their daughters were Astydameia, Nicippe, Lysidice, Mytilene, and Eurydice, and their sons were Atreus, Thyestes, Pittheus, Alcathous, Troezen, Hippalcimus, Copreus, Dias, and Hippasus. Aelius, Cleonymus, Sciron, Argeius, Corinthius, Dysponteus, and Pleisthenes are also listed as her sons.

Mythology 
Hippodamia's father, King Oenomaus of Pisa, was fearful of a prophecy that claimed he would be killed by his son-in-law. So when suitors arrived, he told them they could marry his daughter only if they defeated him in a chariot race, and if they lost, they would be executed. Eighteen suitors of Hippodamia had perished in this way, and Oenamaus had affixed their heads to the wooden columns of his palace. Pausanias was shown what was purported to be the last standing column in the late second century CE; the same author mentions that Pelops erected a monument in honor of all the suitors before himself, and enlists their names, which are as follows:

 Marmax
 Alcathous, son of Porthaon
 Euryalus
 Eurymachus
 Crotalus
 Acrias of Lacedaemon, founder of Acriae
 Capetus
 Lycurgus
 Lasius
 Chalcodon
 Tricolonus
 Aristomachus
 Prias
 Pelagon
 Aeolius
 Cronius
 Erythras, son of Leucon
 Eioneus, son of Magnes

Pelops, son of King Tantalus of Lydia, came to ask for Hippodamia's hand in marriage and prepared to race Oenomaus. Worried about losing, Pelops went to the seaside and invoked Poseidon, his former lover. Reminding Poseidon of their love ("Aphrodite's sweet gifts"), he asked Poseidon for help. Smiling, Poseidon caused a chariot drawn by winged horses to appear.

In an episode that was added to the simple heroic chariot race, Pelops, still unsure of himself (or alternatively, Hippodamia herself), convinced Oenomaus's charioteer, Myrtilus, a son of Hermes, to help him win. Myrtilus was convinced by Pelops or Hippodamia promising him half of Oenomaus' kingdom and the first night in bed with Hippodamia. The night before the race, while Myrtilus was putting Oenomaus's chariot together, he replaced the bronze linchpins attaching the wheels to the chariot axle with fake ones made of beeswax. The race began, and went on for a long time but just as Oenomaus was catching up to Pelops and readying to kill him, the wheels flew off and the chariot broke apart. Myrtilus survived, but Oenomaus was dragged to death by his horses.

When Myrtilus tried to claim his reward and have sex with Hippodamia, Pelops  killed Myrtilus by throwing him off a cliff into the sea. If Hippodamia was the one who asked Myrtilus for help and did not tell Pelops, then Pelops may have assumed that Myrtilus was trying to rape Hippodamia.

As Myrtilus died, he cursed Pelops. This was the source of the curse that haunted Hippodamia and Pelops' children Atreus and Thyestes as well as their descendants Agamemnon, Aegisthus, Menelaus and Orestes.

Later on, Hippodamia killed herself because by her urging the bastard son of Pelops, Chrysippus, was killed.

Ancient Olympia 
At the Olympia, Greece within the Altis by the entrance which was called the Hippodameium (Ἱπποδάμειον) there was a place in which once per year the women honored the Hippodamia with rituals. In addition, the Eleans declare that because of an oracle they brought the bones of Hippodamia to Olympia.

Artistic and anthropological perspectives 
Walter Burkert notes that though the story of the contest for Hippodamia's hand figures in the Hesiodic Megalai Ehoiai and on the chest of Cypselus (ca. 570 BCE) that was conserved at Olympia, and though preparations for the chariot-race figured in the east pediment of the great temple of Zeus at Olympia, the myth of the chariot race only became important at Olympia with the introduction of chariot racing in the twenty-fifth Olympiad (680 BCE). Georges Devereux connected the "courtship" of Hippodamia with animal husbandry taboos of Elis, and the influence of Elis at Olympia that grew in the seventh century.

See also 
Heraean Games
Theseus saving Hippodamia, 1908 sculpture

References

Princesses in Greek mythology
Queens in Greek mythology
Suicides in Greek mythology